Gunnar Trumbull is an American political scientist, currently the Philip Caldwell Professor of Business Administration at Harvard Business School. He graduated from Harvard College and MIT. At MIT, he earned a PhD in political science.

References

Year of birth missing (living people)
Living people
Harvard Business School faculty
American economists
American political scientists
Harvard College alumni
MIT School of Humanities, Arts, and Social Sciences alumni